Adam Merrin is an American singer-songwriter. He was the keyboardist for the Los Angeles–based rock band The 88, and later joined The Three O'Clock. Songs from Merrin's solo work have been featured on Grey's Anatomy, The Big C, Kyle XY, How I Met Your Mother, Greek, The L.A. Complex, Bones, Necessary Roughness, Reaper, Newport Harbor: The Real Orange County, and in the film The Haunting Hour Volume One: Don't Think About It.

Solo discography 

 Albums
 Have Another One (2009) Natural Energy Lab

 EPs
 Have One (2007) Natural Energy Lab

Awards 
In 2011, Merrin's song, "Still Alright" won "Best Song in a Television show" for "Necessary Roughness" at the Hollywood Music in Media Awards.

The 88 

Merrin produced, mixed, and engineered The 88's 2003 debut CD, Kind of Light, and the group won the LA Weekly award for Best Pop/Rock Band that year. Kind of Light was also featured as Radio & Records Album of the Week. The group released seven full-length albums, were the backing band for the Ray Davies Fall 2011 US Tour, and opened for acts like The Smashing Pumpkins, The B-52's, Elliott Smith, and Flaming Lips. Their track "At Least It Was Here" is the opening theme song for the television series Community.

Producer Credits
 Kind of Light (June 2003) EMK/Mootron Records

In 2014, Merrin produced Heavy Metal Anthem 's debut EP. Their song "Say Tonight" was featured on NBC's About A Boy. Adam's production credits also include Laura Jane Scott. One of the songs they recorded together, "The Librarian", was featured on ABC's Castle.

Co-Producer Credits

 Albums with The 88
 This Must Be Love (November 2009) 88 Records
 The 88 (September 2010) 88 Records
 Fortune Teller (June 2013) 88 Records
 Close To You (December 2016) 88 Records

 Eps with The 88
 No One Here (February 2010) 88 Records
 Actors (March 2012) 88 Records

 Singles with The 88
 All I Want For Christmas Is You (November 2009) 88 Records
 Love Is The Thing (June 2009) 88 Records

Additional recordings 

Adam has recorded piano with Ray Davies, Matt Costa, Rusty Anderson, and 311.

References

External links 

Official website

Living people
Year of birth missing (living people)
The Three O'Clock members
The 88 members
21st-century American keyboardists